Chuanchia labiosa is a species of cyprinid fish that is only found in the upper reaches of the Yellow River basin in the Qinghai–Tibet Plateau of China, where it mostly inhabits slow-flowing cold waters at altitudes above . It is the only member of its genus, but is related to other schizothoracines (snowtrout and allies) like Aspiorhynchus, Diptychus, Gymnodiptychus, Gymnocypris, Oxygymnocypris, Platypharodon, Ptychobarbus, Schizopyge, Schizopygopsis and Schizothorax.

Its lower jaw has a horny sheath, which it uses to scrape invertebrates and algae off the bottom. It has seriously declined because of habitat loss, overfishing and introduced species, and is now listed as vulnerable on China's Red List.

References

Cyprinid fish of Asia
Freshwater fish of China
Taxa named by Solomon Herzenstein
Fish described in 1891